Charles II (9 November 1467 – 30 June 1538) was a member of the House of Egmond who ruled as Duke of Guelders and Count of Zutphen from 1492 until his death. He was the son of Adolf of Egmond and Catharine of Bourbon. He had a principal role in the Frisian peasant rebellion and the Guelders Wars.

Life
Charles was born either at Arnhem
or at Grave, Netherlands, and raised at the Burgundian court of Charles the Bold, who had bought the duchy of Guelders from Adolf of Egmond in 1473. He fought in several battles against the armies of Charles VIII of France, until he was captured in the Battle of Béthune in 1487.

King Maximilian subsequently managed to acquire the Burgundian lands for the Habsburgs by marriage. In 1492, the citizens of Guelders, disenchanted with Maximilian's rule, ransomed Charles and recognized him as their Duke. As Duke his regent was his aunt Catherine. Charles was supported by the French King, but in 1505, Guelders was regained by King Maximilian's son Philip the Handsome. Charles had to accompany Philip to Spain to attend Philip's coronation as King of Castile but at Antwerp, Charles managed to escape. Shortly afterwards, Philip died in Spain and by July 1513 Charles had regained control over the whole of Guelders.
In his conflict with the Habsburgs, Charles also became a major player behind the scenes of the Frisian peasant rebellion and at first financially supported the rebel leader Pier Gerlofs Donia. After the tides turned against the rebels, Charles stopped his support and switched sides together with his military commander Maarten van Rossum.
In the Treaty of Gorinchem (1528), Emperor Charles, son of Philip the Handsome, proposed to recognize Charles of Egmond as Duke of Guelders under the condition that he would inherit the Duchy should the Duke die without issue. The Duke, who at the time did not have any children, delayed signing the treaty. Another battle ensued, after which the passage was removed from the treaty. In 1536 there was finally peace between Guelders and Burgundy with the Treaty of Grave.

Charles died at Arnhem, and is buried in the St. Eusebius Church there.

Family
In 1519, Charles married young Elisabeth of Brunswick-Lüneburg (1494–1572). The marriage remained childless. Charles however fathered several illegitimate children.

His only legitimate (twin) sister, Philippa (1467–1547), survived him and died during the reign of her great-grandson, Charles III, Duke of Lorraine (1543–1608).

Ancestors

References

1467 births
1538 deaths
People from Grave, North Brabant
House of Egmond
Dukes of Guelders
Dutch nobility
Burials in Gelderland